Marbois is a commune in the department of Eure, northern France. The municipality was established on 1 January 2016 by merger of the former communes of Chanteloup, Le Chesne (the seat), Les Essarts and Saint-Denis-du-Béhélan. The merging of the towns swelled the size of the population from 591 in 2013 to 1,326 in 2019.

In 2022 the town commissioned the construction of a town stadium next to the local school. This was accompanied by the planting of hedge-rows to increase biodiversity.

See also 
Communes of the Eure department

References 

Communes of Eure
Populated places established in 2016
2016 establishments in France